Banner Bank is a Washington-chartered commercial bank headquartered in Walla Walla, Washington, with roots that date back to 1890. The bank provides services in commercial real estate, construction, residential, agricultural and consumer loans. It also provides community banking services through its branches and loan offices located in Washington, Oregon, Idaho and California. 

Banner Bank is a member of the Federal Home Loan Bank System and its deposits are insured by the Federal Deposit Insurance Corporation.

Banner Bank is a wholly owned subsidiary of Banner Corporation. Banner Corporation common stock is publicly traded on the NASDAQ Global Market® under the symbol "BANR".

History

Banner's roots date back to 1890, when the National Building Loan & Trust Association was founded in Walla Walla, Washington. The bank grew over the following century and in October 2000 changed its name to Banner Corp and announced its 38 branches would all operate as Banner Bank. Previously, the Washington and Idaho branches had operated under separate brands such as First Savings Bank, Whatcom State Bank, Seaport Citizens Bank and Towne Bank.

In 2010, Mark J. Grescovich was named president of Banner Corporation and Banner Bank. A few months later, Banner Corp unloaded 75 million of its shares to raise capital.

Banner Bank acquired Islanders Bank of San Juan County in December 2006, F&M Bank of Spokane Valley (14 branches) in May 2007, NCW Community Bank of Wenatchee in October 2007, Siuslaw Bank of Florence, Oregon (10 branches) in March 2015, AmericanWest Bank of Spokane (105 branches, including in Utah and California) in October 2015, Skagit Bank of Burlington in November 2018, AltaPacific Bank in Santa Rosa in Q4 of 2019.

In October 2017, Banner Bank sold all of its seven Utah branches to Bank of American Fork (now Altabank).

Services

Deposit products include checking, savings, money market accounts, IRAs and Certificates of Deposit. Related to lending, consumers can access personal loans and lines of credit, including auto, RV, home equity loans and home equity lines of credit (HELOC) among others.

Home lending is a significant portion of Banner's overall lending, and the bank is a direct financing source (non-broker). Clients can access all types of home loans including, fixed-rate, adjustable rate, Veteran's Administration loans, first-time home buyer programs and more. Clients can apply online directly from the Banner Bank website.

The bank offers solutions for business and commercial banking clients of all asset sizes.  This includes traditional commercial loans and lines, income property loans, merger and acquisition financing, and agricultural lending. Banner also has lending teams specializing in commercial real estate builder financing and large-scale multi-family lending. Additionally, Banner has developed a QuickStep loan program to offer businesses with smaller lending needs a swift application to funding channel—with decisions often in just a few days from completed application.

References

Companies based in Walla Walla County, Washington
Economy of the Northwestern United States
Lake Oswego, Oregon
San Juan County, Washington
American companies established in 1890
Banks established in 1890
Banks based in Washington (state)
Companies listed on the Nasdaq